The Curse of Yig is a collection of fantasy and horror short stories and essays by American writer Zealia Bishop. It was released in 1953 and was the author's only collection published by Arkham House.  It was released in an edition of 1,217 copies.

The three stories had originally appeared in the magazine Weird Tales and were actually ghostwritten by H. P. Lovecraft.  The stories are part of the Cthulhu Mythos.

Contents

The Curse of Yig contains the following tales:
 "The Curse of Yig"
 "Medusa's Coil"
 "The Mound"
 "H.P. Lovecraft: A Pupil's View"
 "A Wisconsin Balzac: A Profile of August Derleth"

Reception
Boucher and McComas, while dismissing the fiction as "three negligible stories from Weird Tales, praised the "two first-rate biographical profiles."

References

Sources

1953 short story collections
Fantasy short story collections
Horror short story collections
Cthulhu Mythos stories